Antonio Ortiz may refer to:
 Antonio Ortiz Ramírez, Spanish anarchist
 Antonio Ortiz Echagüe, Spanish painter
 Antonio Ortiz Gacto,  Spanish artist
 Antonio Ortiz Mayans, Paraguayan author and composer
 Antonio Ortiz Mena, Mexican economist
 Antonio Ortiz Muñoz, Spanish novelist